This is a list of seasons completed by the Loyola Ramblers men's college basketball team.

Seasons

References

 
Loyola Ramblers
Loyola Ramblers basketball seasons